This is a list of the sessions of the Delaware General Assembly showing majority parties and leadership for each body and each session. Also included are the corresponding Governors and Lieutenant Governors where applicable. Delaware was one of the 13 colonies of Great Britain that joined the American War of Independence. The General Assembly was formed at that time and has met since then under four state constitutions as indicated.

Constitution of 1776
Under the Delaware Constitution of 1776 the General Assembly consisted of The Legislative Council and the House of Assembly. There were nine members of the Council, three from each county, and twenty-one members of the Assembly, seven from each county. All members were elected "at-large" from a multi-member district that included their entire county. Elections were held the first day of October, and terms began on the 20th day of October, lasting three years for the Council and one year for the House. Approximately one third of the Senate was elected every year. Sessions were generally held several times every year.

Constitution of 1792
Under the Delaware Constitution of 1792 the General Assembly consisted of the Senate and the House of Representatives. There were nine members of the Senate, three from each county, and twenty-one members of the House of Representatives, seven from each county. All members were elected "at-large" from a multi-member district that included their entire county. Elections were held the first Tuesday of October and terms began on the first Tuesday in January, lasting three years for the Senate and one year for the House. Approximately one third of the Senate was elected every year. Sessions were generally held once every year.

Constitution of 1831
Under the Delaware Constitution of 1831 the General Assembly consisted of the Senate and the House of Representatives. There were nine members of the Senate, three from each county, and twenty-one members of the House of Representatives, seven from each county. All members were elected "at-large" from a multi-member district that included their entire county. Elections were held the first Tuesday after November 1 and terms began on the first Tuesday in January, lasting four years for the Senate and two years for the House. Approximately half of the Senate was elected every two years. Sessions were generally held once every two years, in the odd numbered year.

Constitution of 1897
Under the original Delaware Constitution of 1897 the General Assembly consisted of the Senate and the House of Representatives. Elections were held the first Tuesday after November 1 and terms begin on the second Tuesday in January, lasting four years for the Senate and two years for the House. Approximately half of the Senate was elected every two years. Sessions were generally held once every year, lasting no longer than June 30.

Prior to 1965, there were seventeen members of the Senate, seven from New Castle County and five each from Kent and Sussex County. There were thirty-five members of the House of Representatives, fifteen from New Castle County and ten each from Kent and Sussex County. All members were elected from single member districts.

Amended Constitution of 1897
Under the amended Delaware Constitution of 1897 the General Assembly consists of the Senate and the House of Representatives. Elections are held the first Tuesday after November 1 and terms begin on the second Tuesday in January, lasting four years for the Senate and two years for the House. Approximately half of the Senate is elected every two years. Sessions are generally held once every year, lasting no longer than June 30.

Since 1965 the membership of the Senate has increased to twenty-one members and the House to forty-one members. All members are elected from single member districts, with roughly equal population, reapportioned at each census. While district boundaries no longer necessarily follow county boundaries, in the Senate there are presently fourteen districts mostly in New Castle County, three mostly in Kent County, and four mostly in Sussex County. In the House there are presently twenty-six districts mostly in New Castle County, seven mostly in Kent County, and eight mostly in Sussex County.

References

External links 
Delaware General Assembly

Places with more information
Delaware Historical Society; website; 505 Market St, Wilmington, Delaware; (302) 655-7161
University of Delaware; Library website; 181 South College Ave, Newark, Delaware; (302) 831–2965

General Assembly